Vampyronassa rhodanica ("vampire fish trap") is an extinct vampyromorph cephalopod known from around 20 fossils from the Lower Callovian (165–164 Ma) of La Voulte-sur-Rhône, Ardèche, France.

Morphology 

This taxon differs from the modern vampire squid in having longer first dorsal arms, a larger hyponome, and a more elongated mantle. Original description described  possible luminous organs, however in restudy they could not be confirmed. It had eight arms with uniserial suckers flanked by cirri, same as modern vampire squid. Retractile filaments that is known from modern vampire squid is not known in Vampyronassa. Like vampire squid, Vampyronassa lacked of ink sac.

Classification 
Vampyronassa shares some characters with modern vampire squid Vampyroteuthis, such as lack of ink sac and unique type of sucker attachment. Analysis supports the sister relationship between Vampyronassa and Vampyroteuthis.

Palaeoecology 

Although modern vampire squid is deep-sea opportunistic detritivore and zooplanktivore, Vampyronassa is estimated to be an active predator following a pelagic mode of life according to characters of its arms. Considering Oligocene vampyromorph Necroteuthis probably had deep-sea mode of life, initial shift of vampiromophs to offshore environments was possibly driven by onshore competition.

References

Prehistoric cephalopod genera
Octopodiformes
Jurassic cephalopods
Fossils of France
Fossil taxa described in 2002